The Carrier Classic was a  series of college basketball games that were played on the deck of a U. S. Navy aircraft carrier. The first game was held on November 11, 2011 aboard , between Michigan State and North Carolina. President Barack Obama attended this game. In 2012, the similar Armed Forces Classic was established.

Games

2011

The inaugural Carrier Classic was played on Veterans Day, November 11, 2011. The North Carolina Tar Heels defeated the Michigan State Spartans, 67–55, before 8,111 fans which included members of the military, President Barack Obama and his family. Harrison Barnes was the top scorer for North Carolina with 17 points, while John Henson added 12 points. Branden Dawson and Adreian Payne each scored 10 points for Michigan State. The teams wore a special camouflage pattern on their uniforms. During the first half, the game was paused while sailors on board Carl Vinson conducted the evening retiring of colors at sunset.

Temporary seating was built directly on the flight deck, in addition to the court and lighting.  A duplicate setup was built in the hangar bay in case of inclement weather, but was not needed.

2012
The 2012 Carrier Classic was scheduled for November 9, 2012 on board  in Charleston Harbor, South Carolina. It was supposed to be a double header, with one game featuring the women's teams of Notre Dame and  Ohio State, and the other game featuring the men's teams of Marquette and  Ohio State.
 
Proceeds benefited charitable organizations including the Wounded Warrior Project, and tickets were available for veterans and members of the armed forces, as well as for sale to the public. 

The 2012 Carrier Classic between Marquette and Ohio State was cancelled due to condensation on the court, an issue which was not present during the earlier Ohio State–Notre Dame game. The other men's game that day, between Florida and Georgetown, was started and played through the first half, with the Gators leading the Hoyas 27–23. However, the same condensation issue arose, and the second half was not played, with the game later cancelled and all stats accumulated during the game erased.

Scores

References

External links
 Official website
 Tar Heels Win Inaugural Quicken Loans Carrier Classic Aboard Carl Vinson
 Michigan State agrees to 2013
 UConn to attend Carrier Classic
 President Barack Obama to attend inaugural game

2011 establishments in California
2012 disestablishments in California
College men's basketball competitions in the United States
Recurring events disestablished in 2012
Recurring sporting events established in 2011